Graphium sarpedon, the common bluebottle or blue triangle in Australia, is a species of swallowtail butterfly that is found in South and Southeast Asia, as well as eastern Australia. There are approximately sixteen subspecies with differing geographical distributions.

Description

Upperside opaque black. Forewings and hindwings crossed from above the tornal area on the hindwing to near the apex of the forewing by a semi-hyaline broad pale blue medial band which is broadest in the middle, more or less greenish and macular anteriorly; the portion of the band that crosses interspaces 6, 7 and 8 on the hindwing white; beyond the band on the hindwing there is a sub-terminal line of blue slender lunules. Underside similar, ground colour dark brown. Hindwing: a short comparatively broad sub-basal band from costa to sub-costal vein, and the postdiscal area between the medial blue band and the sub-terminal lunules velvety black traversed by the pale veins and transversely, except in interspaces 6 and 7, by narrow crimson lines; lastly, a crimson spot near the tornal angle with an admarginal yellowish-white spot below it. Antenna, head, thorax and abdomen brown, the head and thorax suffused with greenish grey; beneath: the palpi, thorax and abdomen touched with dingy white, the abdomen with two whitish lateral lines.

Male has abdominal fold within grey, furnished with a tuft of long, somewhat stiff white hairs.

Race teredon, Felder. (South India and Sri Lanka) is distinguishable in both sexes by the narrower medial band that crosses both forewing and hindwing. Colour brighter, the contrast between the green of the upper and the blue of the lower portion of the medial band more vivid. Hindwing more produced posteriorly at apex of vein 3, where it forms an elongate tooth or short tail.

Variously reported with wingspans between 55 and 75 mm, the common bluebottle has black upper wings and brown lower wings. Both forewings and hindwings are marked by a central spot in the form of a blue or blue-green triangle, with apex pointing toward the body.

Habitat
Graphium sarpedon is primarily an inhabitant of moist, low-level rain forests (below 1600 m (5000 ft)). In these elevations it is usually seen flying just above the tree canopy. The larvae of the common bluebottle feed on trees of the laurel family, which includes the cinnamon tree, and have expanded their range to include cinnamon tree plantations. In eastern Australia, they have adapted to a drier subtropical environment, and are commonly seen in suburban gardens in Queensland and New South Wales.

Distribution

The known distributions of some of the sixteen recognized subspecies:

 G. s. sarpedon (Linnaeus, 1758) - India, Sri Lanka
 G. s. teredon - India, Sri Lanka
 G. s. semifasciatus - China
 G. s. connectens - China, Taiwan
 G. s. nipponum - Japan
 G. s. messogis - Indonesia, Solomon Islands, New Guinea
 G. s. islander Monastyrskii, 2012 - Vietnam 
 G. s. wetterensis Okano, 1993 - Indonesia, Lesser Sunda Islands, Wetter Island
 G. s. choredon - eastern Australia
 G. s. luctatius - Malaysia
 G. s. isander (Godman & Salvin, 1888) - Bougainville Island, Shortland Islands, Santa Isabel Island, Guadalcanal, Florida Islands, Choiseul Island.
G. s. adonarensis   (Rothschild, 1896)  - Sumbawa, Flores, Adonara. Status revised to full species by Page and Treadaway (2013)

Subspecies found in India occur in southern India in the Western Ghats and in the Himalayas from Kashmir in the west to Myanmar.

G. s. milon and G. s. monticolum, however, are not listed here as they are regarded as separate species in a number of works.

Behaviour
The males are known for their habit of feeding by the edges of puddles, often at the roadside. Occasionally, as many as eight will be seen at the same puddle. They have also been known to be attracted to animal droppings, carcasses and rotting insects.

It has been recorded as a migrant in South India and is known to mud-puddle during migration. The butterfly has been seen as comprising as much as 5% of the population of migrating butterflies during a 72-hour period in the Nilgiri hills.

The common bluebottle is known for quick flight and rapid reactions. Consequently, it is difficult to catch.

Diet

The adult common bluebottle feeds on nectar from a variety of flowering herbs. The larvae feed primarily on the leaves of trees in the families Lauraceae, Myrtaceae, Sapotaceae, and Rutaceae. In particular, G.s. sarpedon and G.s. teredon often feed on leaves of the cinnamon bark tree (Cinnamomum zeylanicum) or of the Indian laurel (Litsea sebifera).

The list of larval food plants also include Alseodaphne semecarpifolia, Cinnamomum camphora, Cinnamomum macrocarpum, Cinnamomum malabathrum, Litsea chinensis, Polyalthia longifolia, Miliusa tomentosa, Persea macrantha and Michelia doltospa.

The larvae of G. s. choredon, native to Australia, feed on many native Australian species of genera Cryptocarya and Litsea; and virtually all subspecies feed on leaves of the camphor tree, Cinnamomum camphora, which is native to China but has been naturalized throughout south-east Asia.

Life cycle

Egg
The egg is yellowish, laid singly on the leaves of a host plant.

Larva
When young, is black or dark green, with numerous spines; when full grown, it is green with a short spines on each thoracic segment and anal segment. There is a transverse yellow band on the 4th segment and a lateral band on the body. The caterpillar usually lies on the centre of a leaf on an upper surface. It is very sluggish and pupates near its feeding spot.

Frederic Moore quoted in Bingham, 1907, described it as: "Smooth, thickened from the second to the 5th segment and thence decreasing to the end; with two short subdorsal fleshy spines on the 4th segment, between which is a transverse pale yellow line, two shorter spines also on the 2nd and 3rd and two on the anal segment; colour green, with a longitudinal posterior lateral and lower pale yellowish line."

Pupa
The pupa is green with a slender and pointed thoractic projection, yellowish wing cases and lateral bands. "Conical, truncated in front; thorax produced into a lengthened obtusely-pointed frontal process." (Frederic Moore quoted in Bingham, 1907)

References

General reading
 
 
 s

External links

 NHM Caterpillar hosts database

sarpedon
Butterflies of Asia
Butterflies of Australia
Butterflies described in 1758
Taxa named by Carl Linnaeus
Butterflies of Singapore
Butterflies of Indochina